Jimmy Nelson (9 February 1903 – 16 October 1981) was a Scotland international rugby union player.

Rugby Union career

Amateur career

He played for Glasgow Academicals.

Provincial career

He was capped for Glasgow District.

International career

He was capped 25 times for Scotland.

References

1903 births
1981 deaths
Scottish rugby union players
Scotland international rugby union players
Glasgow Academicals rugby union players
Glasgow District (rugby union) players
Rugby union players from Glasgow
Rugby union scrum-halves